Armin Schweizer (28 April 1892 – 8 October 1968) was a Swiss actor.

Schweizer was born in Zurich, Switzerland and died there at age 76

Selected filmography
 The Pied Piper of Hamelin (1918)
 The Galley Slave (1919)
 The Mayor of Zalamea (1920)
 Stradivari (1935)
 August der Starke (1936)
 Der Kaiser von Kalifornien (1936)
 Kleine Scheidegg (1937)
 The Mountain Calls (1938)
 Nanon (1938)
 Bachelor's Paradise (1939)
 Constable Studer (1939)
  Who's Kissing Madeleine? (1939)
 The Three Codonas (1940)
 Jakko (1941)
 Riding for Germany (1941)
 Münchhausen (1943)
 Young Hearts (1944)
 Madness Rules (1947)
 An Everyday Story (1948)
 After the Storm (1948)
 Heidi (1952)
 Bandits of the Autobahn (1955)
 Bäckerei Zürrer (1957)
 William Tell (1961)

Bibliography
 Buache, Freddy.  Le cinéma suisse, 1898-1998. L'AGE D'HOMME, 1998.

External links

1892 births
1968 deaths
Swiss male film actors
Swiss male silent film actors
Male actors from Zürich